Raise the Titanic is a 1980 adventure film produced by Lew Grade's ITC Entertainment and directed by Jerry Jameson. The film, written by Eric Hughes (adaptation) and Adam Kennedy (screenplay), is based on the 1976 book of the same name by Clive Cussler. The storyline concerns a plan to recover the RMS Titanic due to the fact that it was carrying cargo valuable to Cold War hegemony.

The film stars Jason Robards, Richard Jordan, David Selby, Anne Archer, and Sir Alec Guinness. It received mixed reviews by critics and audiences and proved to be a box-office bomb, grossing about $7 million against an estimated $40 million budget. Producer Lew Grade later remarked "it would have been cheaper to lower the Atlantic".

Plot
In the wilds of Northern Siberia, an American geologist/spy breaks into an old, snow-covered mine, where he discovers the frozen body of a US Army sergeant. Next to the corpse is a wooden marker dated 1912. Using his Geiger counter, the geologist/spy discovers that the mineral he seeks was there. He is then chased away by a Soviet soldier, who shoots him while in pursuit.

US intelligence soon find out that the wooden shipping boxes containing the raw mineral were loaded onto the RMS Titanic in April 1912 by an American. A search is conducted in the North Atlantic to locate the sunken ocean liner. It is aided by one of the Titanic last survivors who explains he was also the last person to see the American alive. Just before the Titanic foundered, the sailor said he locked the man inside the ship's vault containing the boxes of mineral, his last words being, "Thank God for Southby!"
   
Salvage experts begin the dangerous job of raising the Titanic from the seabed, during which one of the submersibles, Starfish, experiences a cabin flood and implodes. Another submersible, the Deep Quest, experiences a battery shortage, which causes its manipulator arm to become locked onto the Titanics wreckage.

Eventually, the rusting Titanic is brought to the surface using multiple compressed air tanks and buoyancy aids. The passenger liner is then towed to a dry dock in New York, its original destination. It turns out no expense is being spared because the rare mineral will be used as the power source in a proposed weapons system that could take down any missile entering US airspace. In response, the USSR challenges the United States over the salvage of Titanic because they claim the mineral was taken illegally from the Soviet Union. On entering the watertight vault, the salvage team discover the mummified remains of the American, but no mineral. The boxes are just full of gravel. It soon becomes evident that a clue was left in the dead American's final words. He had arranged a fake burial in a graveyard in "Southby", England prior to sailing back to the United States on the ill-fated ocean liner. It is decided to leave the mineral buried in the grave because knowledge of its existence would destabilize the status quo that maintains the peace between the West and the Soviet Union.

Cast
 Jason Robards as Admiral James Sandecker
 Richard Jordan as Dirk Pitt
 David Selby as Gene Seagram
 Anne Archer as Dana Archibald
 Alec Guinness as John Bigalow
 Bo Brundin as Captain Andre Prevlov
 M. Emmet Walsh as Master Chief Vinnie Walker
 J.D. Cannon as Captain Joe Burke
 Norman Bartold as Admiral Kemper
 Elya Baskin as Marganin
 Dirk Blocker as Merker
 Robert Broyles as Willis
 Paul Carr as CIA Director Nicholson
 Michael C. Gwynne as Bohannon
 Nancy Nevinson as Sarah Martindale
 Harvey Lewis as Kiel

Development
The novel was published in 1976. In August of that year producer Robert Shaftel reportedly had the film rights, but in the following month it was clarified that the film rights had not yet been offered.

Stanley Kramer
Lew Grade said he read the novel by Clive Cussler and became interested, thinking there was potential for a series along the lines of the James Bond films. He discovered that Stanley Kramer was interested in directing, and Grade said he would buy the rights to the book and let Kramer direct and produce. Kramer was making The Domino Principle for Grade. In October 1976 Grade had the film rights for a reported $450,000.

The book came out in late 1976 and was a best seller. In the summer of 1976 Kramer filmed footage from a Bicentennial Ball which he hoped to use in the movie.

In January 1977 Kramer signed contracts to direct the film and produced by Marvin Starger. In March Grade said he had optioned the rights for two other Dirk Pitt novels, Iceberg and The Sea Dweller.

At the Cannes Film Festival in May 1977, Lew Grade revealed the film as part of a slate of projects which included The Boys from Brazil, The Golden Gate (from a novel by Alistair MacLean directed by Jerry Jameson), and $1.97 about the early years of Charles Bronson.

Pre-production began and models of the ship were built; Grade said that the models were at least two or three times larger than they should be. The model was based on blue prints of the actual Titanic and were built at CBS Studio Center in Studio City at a cost of $5–6 million.

Eventually in December 1977 Lew Grade said that Kramer had left the project due to creative differences. Kramer explained "the factors were casting and the number of miniatures we planned to use. You might say one of the possibilities as to why I left was that I felt things might have cost more. It's always a little sad to see it happen this way. Raise the Titanic was a big challenge – all the excitement of special effects, underwater filming". Kramer said the producers wanted the movie made for $9 million but he felt it would cost $14 million. Kramer was paid off with a fee of $500,000.

Jerry Jameson
In May 1978, Jerry Jameson was picked up as a director, who had been attached to The Golden Gate, which had not been made. Grade said the movie would be his most expensive yet, costing $20 million, but would not feature any major stars, as he commented that "the ship is the star. Anyway the money that would normally go to actors has been spent on our models. They're magnificent". The models cost $5 million. William Frye, who produced Jameson's Airport 77, was hired to produce.

It was felt that the real Titanic, if raised from the bottom of the ocean, would come up rather gradually at a gentle angle, before levelling off on the surface. The tank in North Hollywood was too shallow and would launch the model like a rocket ship. It was decided to film in a bigger tank.

In December 1978 construction began on a water tank in Malta to film the underwater scenes. Grade said that "Malta was the only place we could find an existing tank with the right location and the right surroundings".

A double for the Titanic was found in Athens.

Screenplay
The screenplay also underwent numerous rewrites. The first writer to work on it was Adam Kennedy, who wrote the script for Stanley Kramer's film for Lew Grade, The Domino Principle. He was followed by Eric Hughes, Millard Kaufman and Arnold Schulman. Kennedy was brought back to do further revisions on the script and he gets sole credit.

Novelist Larry McMurtry – who disliked Cussler's novel, considering it "less a novel than a manual on how to raise a very large boat from deep beneath the sea" – claims that he was one of approximately 17 writers who worked on the screenplay and the only one not to petition for a credit on the finished film.

Admiral David Cooney, Chief of Information for the Navy, demanded the script be rewritten so as the Russians did not come off smarter than the Americans.

Cussler was furious with the final result, because most of the original plot had been rejected leaving a hollow shell of his story; additionally he felt that the casting was wrong. Elements of the novel which did survive into the film were the discovery of the cornet that leads the search party to the wreck, and the eventual discovery of the mineral not in the Titanic cargo hold, but in the Southby graveyard, although in the novel's story it is exhumed and the Sicilian Project is tested.

Casting
Elliott Gould was offered a lead role, but turned it down: "I don't want to raise the Titanic. Let the Titanic stay where it is".

Jason Robards said he did the film for "money, m'dear, money... We're all incidental to the hardware and the special effects on this one".

In October 1979, Richard Jordan was cast as Dirk Pitt.

Clive Cussler made a cameo in the film as a reporter at the script conference.

Filming
Filming started in October 1979 at CBS Studio Center. By this stage $15 million had already been spent on the tank and models.

An old Greek ocean liner, SS Athinai (which was scrapped in 1989), was converted into a replica of the Titanic. A scale model was used for close-up underwater scenes. At the time of filming there were conflicting views as to whether the Titanic had broken up as she foundered based on the original eyewitness testimony of the survivors, and – in line with the novel's assumption against the break-up narrative – the ship was portrayed as intact in the film. In 1985 the wreck of the real Titanic was located, confirming that she had broken up during the disaster, and lay in two pieces on the bottom of the North Atlantic in a state of advanced corrosion.

A 10-tonne  scale model was also built for the scene where the Titanic is raised to the surface. Costing $7 million, the model initially proved too large for any existing water tank. This problem led to one of the world's first horizon tanks being constructed at the Mediterranean Film Studios near Kalkara, Malta. The 10 million-gallon tank could create the illusion a ship was at sea. The Titanic model was raised more than 50 times until a satisfactory shot was acquired.

Following the completion of filming, the scale model was left to rust for 30 years at the side of the horizon tank (at ). In January 2003 a storm caused damage to the model. By 2012 the remains of the metal structure had been moved to a new location closer to the sea (at ).

The final scene involved Alec Guinness at St. Ives in Cornwall over two days. The day before the shoot St Ives had its worst storm in one hundred years, destroying the church where the scene was to be shot so it had to be relocated.

Soundtrack
John Barry created the film's musical score, which became the most acclaimed aspect of the production and is considered by many to be one of the very best of Barry's career – closely following the style of his soundtrack for the James Bond film Moonraker the preceding year, with militaristic passages reflecting the Cold War aspects of the plot to the dark, cold, brooding compositions reflected in the underwater scenes.

Though the original recordings of the music have been lost, Silva Screen Records, along with Nic Raine, one of Barry's orchestrators, commissioned a re-recording in 1999 of the complete score with the City of Prague Philharmonic Orchestra.

In August 2014 Network On Air were to release Raise The Titanic on Blu-ray in the UK, with the only known available original Barry score. There are tapes from M&E which contain the score plus sound effects. There is no known source for the original, complete score.

In March 1980 Marble Arch auctioned off props for the film among others.

Release
The film was released by a new distribution company, AFD.

The film premiered in 1980. Twelve minutes were cut after the premiere.

The film was released on VHS in 1986 by CBS/Fox Home Video.

Reception
Raise the Titanic received mixed reviews and has a 38% on Rotten Tomatoes from 8 reviews.

Cussler was so disgusted with the film that he refused to give any permission for further film adaptations of his books. In 2006, Cussler sued the filmmakers of Sahara, a film adaption of his 1992 book, for failing to consult him on the script when it also made huge financial losses.

The film grossed $7 million against a budget of $40 million.

Lew Grade later wrote that he "thought the movie was quite good", particularly the actual raising of the Titanic and the scene where Dirk Pitt walks into the wrecked ballroom. He blamed the failure of the film in part on the release of a TV movie on the topic, S.O.S. Titanic (released theatrically through EMI Films, of which Grade's brother, Lord Delfont, was then chairman).  Grade was quoted years later as saying "It would have been cheaper to lower the Atlantic."

Raise the Titanic, along with other contemporary flops, has been credited with prompting Grade's withdrawal from continued involvement with the film industry.

Nominations

1st Golden Raspberry Award
Nominated: Worst Picture
Nominated: Worst Supporting Actor (David Selby)
Nominated: Worst Screenplay

References

External links
 
 
 

1980 films
1980s action adventure films

1980 independent films
British action adventure films

American action adventure films
1980s English-language films
Dirk Pitt films
Films based on American novels
Films based on works by Clive Cussler
Films set in New York City
Films shot in Alaska
Films shot in California
Films shot in England
Films shot in Greece
Films shot in Los Angeles
Films shot in Malta
Films shot in New York City
Films shot in Washington, D.C.
British independent films
Films about RMS Titanic
ITC Entertainment films
Films scored by John Barry (composer)
Films directed by Jerry Jameson
American independent films
1980s American films
1980s British films